Ogurja Ada (sometimes also spelt "Ogurga") is the largest island in both Turkmenistan and the Caspian Sea by area. Ogurja Island is also widely known by its Russian name Ogurchinskiy Island (Ostrov Ogurchinskiy).

Geography
Ogurja is a desert island that lies not far from the coast in the southeastern Caspian Sea. It is located 17 km SSW of the southern tip of the Cheleken Peninsula.

Ogurja Ada is very long and narrow. It runs from north to south, having a length of 42 km and a maximum width of 1.5 km. It is made up of low sand dunes, mostly covered with grass and bushes. The northern end, which was formerly a compact mass, was broken up into smaller islets by wave action.

The island has no permanent settlements owing to the lack of fresh water. Between the 15th and the 17th centuries, Ogurchinskiy was a refuge for pirates and wayfarers and, later, was a leper colony.
Administratively Ogurja Ada belongs to the Balkan Province (Balkan Welaýaty) of Turkmenistan.

Ecology
Caspian seals (Pusa caspica) and varied marine birds inhabit the island. Ogurja Ada is part of the Hazar Nature Reserve of Turkmenistan.

References

External links
Bird life

Islands of the Caspian Sea
Balkan Region
Islands of Turkmenistan